Rorippa palustris, marsh yellow cress, is a species of flowering plant in the family Brassicaceae. It is widespread and native to parts of Africa, and much of Asia, Europe and Eurasia, North America and the Caribbean. It can also be found in other parts of the world as an introduced species and a common weed, for example, in Australia and South America. It is an adaptable plant which grows in many types of damp, wet, and aquatic habitat. It may be an annual, biennial, or perennial plant, and is variable in appearance as well.

Description
It produces an erect stem, sometimes with branches, attaining a maximum height of just over one meter. The leaves are up to 30 centimeters long and have toothed to deeply lobed edges. The inflorescence is a raceme of mustardlike flowers with spoon-shaped yellow petals each a few millimeters in length. The fruit is a dehiscent and smoothly valved silicle, up to a centimeter long, and containing anywhere from 20 to 90 minute seeds.

Etymology
The species epithet palustris is Latin for "of the marsh" and indicates its common habitat.

Common names
In botanical literature, Rorippa palustris has been called by numerous common names (with variations). Some of them are listed here:
bog marshcress
bog yellowcress
common yellowcress
marsh yellowcress (or marsh yellow-cress)
marshcress (or marsh cress)
yellow cress
yellow watercress (or yellow-watercress)

Distribution
Rorippa palustris is native to, or naturalized across much of the globe.

Native range
AFRICA: in Egypt and Ethiopia.
ASIA and EURASIA: in Afghanistan; Bhutan; the Caucasus (in Armenia, Azerbaijan, Georgia, and Russia) and Ciscaucasia (in Dagestan); much of China and Taiwan; India (in the states of Assam, Bihar, Himachal Pradesh, Jammu and Kashmir, and West Bengal); Indonesia (in Papua province, Java, the Lesser Sunda, and Maluku Islands); Japan (in the prefectures of Hokkaido, Honshu, Kyushu, Shikoku, and the Ryukyu Islands); Kazakhstan; the Korean Peninsula; Kyrgyzstan; Mongolia; Pakistan; Papua New Guinea; eastern and western Siberia; Tajikistan; northeastern Turkey; Turkmenistan; Uzbekistan; and Yemen.

EUROPE: grows natively in most regions.
NORTH AMERICA: in every province and territory (excluding Nunavut) of Canada; Puerto Rico; the District of Columbia and every state (excluding Hawaii) in the United States; Mexico
The CARIBBEAN: in Cuba and Haiti.
AUSTRALASIA: New Zealand

Naturalized range
AUSTRALASIA: Australia and New Zealand
MEZO- and SOUTH AMERICA: in Argentina; Brazil; Chile; Ecuador; Panama; Peru; and Suriname.

References

External links

Jepson Manual Treatment of Rorippa palustris
Washington Burke Museum

palustris
Flora of Egypt
Flora of Ethiopia
Flora of Europe
Flora of the Caribbean
Flora of North America
Flora of temperate Asia
Flora of the Indian subcontinent
Flora of Malesia
Plants described in 1753
Taxa named by Carl Linnaeus
Introduced plants of South America
Flora without expected TNC conservation status